Major-General Thomas Stanford Baldock  (January 1854 – August 1937) was a British Army officer.

Military career
Baldock was born Portsea, Portsmouth, Hampshire, in January 1854, the son of William Baldock. Ater being educated at Cheltenham College and the Royal Military Academy, Woolwich, he was commissioned into the Royal Artillery in April 1873. He was promoted to captain in 1882 and major in 1890 and he graduated from the Staff College, Camberley in 1889. He saw action in the Second Boer War and subsequently commanded a column of Royal Artillery Mounted Rifles in South Africa for which he was appointed a Companion of the Order of the Bath.

He was promoted to colonel on 1 January 1903. He became Commander, Royal Artillery for Aldershot Command in August 1907 and then General Officer Commanding (GOC) of the West Riding Division, one of the fourteen divisions of the part-time Territorial Force (TF), in September 1911.

After taking his division to France in April 1915, eight months after the British entry into World War I, he remained in command of the division after it moved to the Western Front. Shortly after arrival, it was redesignated as the 49th (West Riding) Division. According to the diary of the 49th Division's Adjutant and Quartermaster-General (A&QMG), it was on 16 July 1915, while Baldock was at his division's advanced headquarters at Trois Tours, northwest of Ypres, Belgium, near Brielen, where he was severely wounded in the head by shell fire. The A&QMG's diary records that: "Château des Trois Tours. Friday 16th. The Germans shelled Ing. Bde. and Art. Bde H.Q.'s in the morning. At 4:15 pm. they suddenly fired 5 or 6 salvos of shrapnel and H.E. into Trois Tours Château grounds. General Baldock was outside at the time and in endeavouring to get back into the house, whilst the shelling was in progress, was wounded severely in the head by a fragment of shell. He was carried into a dugout and his wound was dressed by a medical officer. He was afterwards removed in a motor car to No.10 Clearing Hospital at Poperinghe." His injuries forced him into retirement from the army in 1916 and he eventually settled in Cornwall, where he died in August 1937, at the age of 83.

References

Bibliography

1854 births
1937 deaths
Military personnel from Portsmouth
Graduates of the Staff College, Camberley
British Army generals of World War I
Companions of the Order of the Bath
British Army major generals
British Army personnel of the Second Boer War
Graduates of the Royal Military Academy, Woolwich
People educated at Cheltenham College
Royal Artillery officers
People from Portsea, Portsmouth